44 Cats is an Italian computer-animated children's television series created by Iginio Straffi. The series is mainly produced by the Rainbow studio, which was co-owned by Viacom at the time of the show's premiere. Viacom's Nickelodeon channels broadcast 44 Cats worldwide, while both RAI's YoYo network and Nick Jr. Italy air the series in Italy. The series follows the adventures of four kittens who make up a musical group called the Buffycats. The series premiered on Rai YoYo in Italy on 11 December 2018.

The series was inspired by a song from the 1968 Zecchino d'Oro competition called "Quarantaquattro gatti".

The series was renewed for a second season, which began airing in Italy in March 2020. It aired internationally later in the year.

Characters

Main
Lampo (voiced by Federico Campaiola in Italian and Sarah Natochenny in English, singing by Elisabeth Tsong) is the lead singer and guitarist of the Buffycats. He is a tabby cat with a blue lightning bolt symbol over his right eye. Lampo's whiskers act like a compass, guiding him to where he needs to go. Although not explicitly stated, it is heavily implied in the episode "Sir Archibald, Gentlecat" that Lampo would be part of a noble family, as his uncle Archibald holds the title "Sir" (Sir Archibald), a title given mainly in European monarchies to barons and knights, implying that he (Sir Archibald) would be a baron or knight.
Milady (voiced by Gea Riva in Italian and Suzy Myers in English, singing by Natalie Rarick) is the Buffycats' bassist. Her fur turns pink whenever someone tells a lie.
Pilou (voiced by Joy Saltarelli in Italian and Simona Berman in English, singing by Piccola Coro) is the Buffycats' drummer. She uses her enchanting wide eyes to distract the show's villains.
Meatball (voiced by Francesco Falco in Italian and Erica Schroeder in English, singing by Samuel Vincent) is the Buffycats' keyboardist. He has a big appetite and can sense danger.
Granny Pina (voiced by Michela Alborghetti in Italian and Marca Leigh in English) is the human owner of an old house where the Buffycats live. She cooks the pasta that gives the Buffycats their special powers.
Winston (voiced by Francesco Prando in Italian and Scottie Ray in English) is Granny Pina's wealthy neighbor who is Boss's owner. He lives in a luxurious villa and despises both the Buffycats and their unsightly house, which he is constantly trying to have torn down, never with any success since the Buffycats always thwart his schemes.
Isotta is Granny Pina's granddaughter, who appears in season two. She is the only human who can understand the cats' language and she often helps the Buffycats.

Supporting
Charlie (voiced by Clay Westman in English) is the Buffycat's stage frightened announcer and hype man. He first appears in season 2, episode 29.
Boss (voiced by Henry F. Benjamin in English) is Winston's pet cat. He is the only animal that Winston likes and is a bullying tomcat who always tries to trick the Buffycats, but they always outsmart him.
Blister and Scab (both voiced by Marc Thompson in English) are two cats closely linked to Boss. Blister is the tall white and blue thin cat, while Scab is the small grey fat cat.
The Boom-Boom Steppers
Fancy Dancey (voiced by Marc Thompson in English) is the leader of the Boom-Boom Steppers. He has grey fur and wears a hat that resembles a Sombrero.
Lola (voiced by Ilaria Georgino in Italian and Alyson Leigh Rosenfeld in English) is the second Boom-Boom Stepper. She is a white cat with a princess outfit. Towards the end of season one, She becomes a mother in "Pilou the Kitten Sitter".
Hope (voiced by Elena Guiliano in Italian and Haven Paschall in English) is Lola's daughter. Her first word was "Pilou" because she was the one who "cat-sitted" her before she brought her back to her mom.
Jumpy (voiced by Lisa Ortiz in English) is the third Boom-Boom Stepper. 
Cosmo (voiced by Eddy Lee) is an astronaut cat who is a good friend of the Buffycats and sometimes goes along with them on their adventures.
Gas (voiced by Billy Bob Thompson) is a stinky cat with droopy whiskers. He is mostly stinky because of an event that happened during his kittenhood and is useful when villains come in to play.
Snobine (voiced by Illara Latini in Italian and Haven Paschall in English) is a sophisticated cat who is Gas's love interest, as the only cat who doesn't mind his stench.
Gaby (voiced by Lisa Ortiz) is a reporter Siamese cat that used to spread false rumors, but now only reports negatively on villains. She sometimes works as an announcer.
Igor (voiced by Daniele Raffaeli in Italian and Sarah Natochenny in English) is a strong Siamese or Birman cat that can lift others with just one arm.
Neko (voiced by Alyson Leigh Rosenfield in English) is a cat with a bell collar and usually has good luck as well as likes collecting four-leaf clovers.
Fleur (voiced by Alyson Leigh Rosenfield in English) is a yellow cat who is obsessed with flowers.
Cato (voiced by Marc Thompson in English) is a black cat who is a master of a cat version of kung fu called "cat fu".
Wrench (voiced by Wayne Grayson in English) is a brown cat that works as a mechanic. He has a Canadian accent in the English dub.
Edison (voiced by Marc Thompson in English) is an inventive cat that has a backpack with wings that can help him soar through the air.
Piperita (voiced by Erica Schroeder in English) is a chef cat that looks like an ocelot who runs a restaurant.
Astricat (voiced by Lisa Ortiz) is a pink alien cat that sleeps upside down and lives on Planet Meow.
Cats in Black (voiced by Mike Pollock, Maxwell Rockatansky and HD Quinn in English) are a group of secret agent cats that help space cats like Astricat in the sky and were inspired by Men in Black.
LaPalette (voiced by Franco Mannella in Italian and HD Quinn in English) is a French cat with an eye for art.
Quatermain (voiced by Marc Thompson in English) is an adventurer cat that searches for ancient treasures.
Tutan-kat-mon (voiced by Maxwell Rockatansky in English) is an ancient cat who is surprisingly still alive despite the fact that his owner is dead; he has a golden scratching post.
The Pinky Paws are a Group of Musical Cats that all have pink fur and when they like something, they call it “furtastic”.
Cherry (voiced by Haven Paschall in English) is the lead singer of the trio and wears Magenta.
Lolly (voiced by Cait Powers-Page in English) is the second Pinky Paw that wears purple.
Betty (voiced by Lauren Delgenio in English) is the third Pinky Paw that wears mint green.
Milky and Choc (both voiced by Wayne Grayson) are two circus cats that are twin brothers.
Scribbly (voiced by Barrett Leddy in English) is a shy cat with glasses that scribbles messages onto paper airplanes.
Snoogie a.k.a. the Masked Cat (voiced by Marc Thompson) is a superhero cat that can fly using his tail.
Olympio (voiced by Billy Bob Thompson) is a teal cat who plays basketball and has never dropped the ball in his whole life.
Cop (voiced by Mike Pollock in English) is a police officer cat.
Ambrogio (voiced by Oreste Baldini in Italian and HD Quinn in English) is a fashionable Siamese cat. 
Cream (voiced by Leardo Graziano in Italian and Dan Edwards in English) is a cat that makes tasty ice cream.
Archibald (voiced by Roberto Stocchi in Italian and Abe Goldfarb in English) is Lampo’s prim and proper uncle, but despite being proper, he’s not afraid to rock out with his nephew.
Corney (voiced by Henry F. Benjamin in English) is a farmer cat that lives at his country farm.
Baby Pie (voiced by Sarah Natochenny in English) is a baby kitten that constantly causes trouble only because he just either wants to play or eat.
Dr. Fisby (voiced by Henry F. Benjamin in English) is a doctor cat that looks after sick cats and makes them feel better.
Jungle (voiced by HD Quinn in English) is a wildcat that lives in a botanical garden with his parrot friend Tata. He loves bananas and can only communicate by growling due to the fact that he isn’t intelligent enough to talk because he never lived near or with humans and instead, in the wild.
Glitter (voiced by Marc Thompson in English) is a blue cat dressed as Santa Claus.

Episodes

Series overview

Season 1 (2018–19)

Season 2 (2020–21)

Broadcast

In September 2018, it was announced that the series would premiere on Rai YoYo in Italy on November 12, 2018. The Rai YoYo debut set a ratings record for the channel, exceeding 520,000 viewers with a 2.7% share. In May 2018, it was announced that the show would air on Nickelodeon's various international channels in countries outside of Italy. In the United States, the series previewed on Nickelodeon on May 25, 2019, followed by the official premiere on June 10. The May 25 preview of the show was the highest-rated children's premiere of the day. The first season was added to Netflix on May 1, 2020.

References

External links
 
 

2019 animated television series debuts
2019 Italian television series debuts
Italian children's animated adventure television series
Italian children's animated comedy television series
Italian children's animated fantasy television series
Animated preschool education television series
2010s preschool education television series
2020s preschool education television series
Nickelodeon original programming
Italian computer-animated television series
Animated television series about cats
Television series by Rainbow S.r.l.
Television series created by Iginio Straffi
Italian-language television shows
English-language television shows